Einar Sverre Pedersen (29 January 1919 – 26 January 2008) was a Norwegian aviator.

He was born in Trondheim to architect Sverre Pedersen and Edith Gretchen Børseth, and was a nephew of industrialist Harald Pedersen and pedagogue Marie Pedersen. He was married to Ewy Maria Westerberg from 1941, and to pilot Ingrid Elisabeth Liljegren from 1958.

During World War II, Pedersen was trained as navigator at the camp Little Norway in Toronto, Canada, and further served with the RAF Ferry Command and the No. 330 Squadron RNoAF. From 1946 he was assigned with the Scandinavian Airlines (SAS), as navigator on transatlantic flights. He was instrumental in the development of navigational aids for commercial traffic over polar regions, and was navigator on the first passenger flight crossing the Arctic in November 1952. His wife Ingrid Elisabeth Liljegren was the first woman to fly over the North Pole, in 1963, with Pedersen as navigator.

References

1919 births
2008 deaths
People from Trondheim
Norwegian aviators
Norwegian expatriates in Canada
Royal Norwegian Navy Air Service personnel of World War II
Royal Norwegian Air Force personnel of World War II
No. 330 Squadron RNoAF personnel
Royal Air Force personnel of World War II